Algerian Tractors Company ATC Spa, is a joint venture company specialized in the development of agricultural machinery. It was created on August 16, 2012 after an agreement between the Algerian company Etrag and the American Group AGCO. The factory produce tractors in El Khroub, close to Constantine, Algeria.

Partnership
Etrag concluded an industrial and commercial partnership with AGCO, world leader in the manufacture of agricultural machinery. They created on 16 August 2012 a joint venture (joint venture) called Algerian Tractors Company ATC Spa. The agreement consisted of two local partners: ETRAG with (36%), Pmat with (15%) and AGCO with (41%).

Products
The factory is producing one Etrag tractor and several Massey Ferguson tractors.

Etrag Models 
Cirta C6807 2x4 (68 CV)

Massey Ferguson Models 
MF 425 2x4 and 4x4 (55 CV)
MF 440 Xtra 4x4 (82 CV)
MF 7150 4x4  (150 CV)

References

External links
http://investors.agcocorp.com/phoenix.zhtml?c=108419&p=irol-newsArticle&ID=1768286
http://www.businesswire.com/news/home/20121218006342/en/AGCO-Starts-Local-Production-North-Africa
 http://blog.agcocorp.com/2013/01/agco-starts-local-production-in-north-africa/

See also
Etrag
Pmat
AGCO

Agricultural machinery manufacturers of Algeria
Tractor manufacturers of Algeria
Government-owned companies of Algeria
Joint ventures
Companies of Algeria
Companies based in Constantine, Algeria
Manufacturing companies established in 2012
2012 establishments in Algeria
Companies established in 2012